Robert Earle Parry (June 24, 1949 – January 27, 2018) was an American investigative journalist. He was known for his role in covering the Iran–Contra affair for the Associated Press (AP) and Newsweek, including breaking the Psychological Operations in Guerrilla Warfare (CIA manual provided to the Nicaraguan contras) and the CIA involvement in Contra cocaine trafficking in the U.S. scandal in 1985.

He was awarded the George Polk Award for National Reporting in 1984 and the I.F. Stone Medal for Journalistic Independence by Harvard's Nieman Foundation in 2015.

Life and career
Born in Hartford, Connecticut, Parry received a B.A. in English from Colby College in Waterville, Maine in 1971 and began his career in journalism in Framingham, Massachusetts working for his father's newspaper The Middlesex Daily News. He joined the Associated Press in 1974, moving to its Washington, D.C. bureau in 1977. Following the 1980 presidential election he was assigned to its Special Assignment (investigative reporting) unit, where he began working on Central America.

Parry was a finalist for the 1985 Pulitzer Prize for National Reporting and received the George Polk Award for National Reporting in 1984 for his work with the Associated Press on Iran-Contra, where he broke the story that the Central Intelligence Agency had provided an assassination manual to the Nicaraguan Contras (Psychological Operations in Guerrilla Warfare). In mid-1985, he wrote the first article on Oliver North's involvement in the affair and, together with Brian Barger in late 1985, he broke the CIA and Contras cocaine trafficking in the US scandal, helping to spark Senator John Kerry's interest in investigating Iran–Contra. The Associated Press had refused to publish the drug trafficking story, and only relented when its Spanish-language newswire service accidentally published a translation. Barger and Parry continued to press their investigation of North even as most of the media declined to follow it up, eventually publishing a story in mid-1986, based on 24 sources, which led to a Congressional committee asking questions of North. After North denied the allegations, Barger was pushed out of the Associated Press, and Parry was unable to publish any further follow-ups to the story until after Eugene Hasenfus' plane (Corporate Air Services HPF821) was shot down in Nicaragua in October 1986. After finding out that his boss had been "conferring with [Oliver] North on a regular basis", Parry left AP in 1987 to join Newsweek, leaving the publication in 1990.

In August 1990, PBS' Frontline asked Parry to work on the October Surprise conspiracy theory, leading to Parry making several documentaries for the program, broadcast in 1991 and 1992. In 1996, Salon wrote about his work on the theory, saying that "his continuing quest to unearth the facts of the alleged October Surprise has made him persona non grata among those who worship at the altar of conventional wisdom."

When journalist Gary Webb published his newspaper series "Dark Alliance" in 1996 alleging that the Reagan administration had allowed the Contras to smuggle cocaine into the US to make money for their efforts, Parry supported Webb amidst heavy criticism from the media.

In 1995, Parry founded the Consortium for Independent Journalism Inc. (CIJ) as a non-profit, US-based independent news service which publishes the website Consortium News.

In October 2015, Parry was awarded the I.F. Stone Medal for Journalistic Independence by Harvard's Nieman Foundation for Journalism, "for his career distinguished by meticulously researched investigations, intrepid questioning, and reporting that has challenged mainstream media.".

In June 2017, Parry was awarded the Martha Gellhorn Prize for Journalism.

Parry died on January 27, 2018, following several strokes caused by undiagnosed pancreatic cancer he had suffered from for the previous four or five years of his life.

Publications

Books
 Fooling America: How Washington Insiders Twist the Truth and Manufacture the Conventional Wisdom. New York: William Morrow (1992)
 Trick or Treason: The October Surprise Mystery. New York: Sheridan Square Press (1993). . .
 The October Surprise X-Files: The Hidden Origins of the Reagan-Bush Era (1996)
 Lost History: Contras, Cocaine, The Press & Project Truth (1999)
 Secrecy & Privilege: Rise of the Bush Dynasty from Watergate to Iraq (2004)
 Neck Deep: The Disastrous Presidency of George W. Bush, with Sam and Nat Parry. Arlington, Virginia: Media Consortium (2007)
 America's Stolen Narrative: From Washington and Madison to Nixon, Reagan and the Bushes to Obama (2012)

Articles
 "Iran-Contra's Untold Story." Foreign Policy, no. 72 (Autumn 1988), pp. 3–30. . .
 "Contra-Cocaine: Big Media's Big Mistakes." I.F. Magazine (July/August 1997), pp. 9-12.
 US House Admits Nazi Role in Ukraine. Consortium News, June 12, 2015.

References

External links
 Consortium News 
 [https://consortiumnews.com/tag/robert-parry/ Articles by Robert Parry at Consortium News website
 Interview with Robert Parry on Lost History & Death of U.S. Journalism
 Outpouring of Support Honors Robert Parry
 

1949 births
2018 deaths
Writers from Hartford, Connecticut
Colby College alumni
Journalists from Connecticut
American alternative journalists
American investigative journalists
American online journalists
Associated Press reporters
Deaths from cancer in Virginia
Deaths from pancreatic cancer
George Polk Award recipients
American political writers
American male non-fiction writers